Zik may refer to:

People
 Nnamdi Azikiwe (1904–1996), a founding father of modern Nigeria
 Zikism, the system of political thought attributed to Nnamdi Azikiwe
 Adir Zik (1939-2005), Israeli television producer and journalist.

Brands
 'Zik, a French television channel
 Kalinin Machine-Building Plant, a Russian industrial factory
 , a Ukrainian television channel owned by Taras Kozak and abbreviation for West-Ukrainian Information Corporation, based in Lviv

Other
 Zimakani language (ISO 639-3: zik), a Papuan language